Martin Rohan (born June 26, 1990) is a Czech professional ice hockey defenceman for HC Karlovy Vary in the Czech Extraliga.

Rohan made his debut for Karlovy Vary during the 2010–11 Czech Extraliga season. He has also played on loan with HC Baník Sokolov, HC Most and SK Kadaň.

His older brother Tomáš Rohan is also a professional ice hockey player.

References

External links

1990 births
Living people
HC Baník Sokolov players
Czech ice hockey defencemen
Sportovní Klub Kadaň players
HC Karlovy Vary players
HC Most players
People from Sokolov
Sportspeople from the Karlovy Vary Region